Mount Diablo Unified School District (MDUSD) is a public school district in Contra Costa County, California. It currently operates 29 elementary schools, 9 middle schools, and 5 high schools, with 7 alternative school programs and an adult education program. MDUSD is one of the largest school districts in the state of California, with over 56 school sites and a budget of approximately $270,000,000. The district has over 36,000 K-12 students, over 20,000 adult education students, and over 3,500 employees, including over 2,000 certificated educators.

Superintendent and Board
The current district superintendent is Adam Clark, Ed.D.
 
The current members of the Board of Education are:

 Brian Lawrence, President (Term expires 2020)
 Debra Mason, Vice President (Term expires 2022)
 Linda Mayo (Term expires 2022)
 Joanne Durkey (Term expires 2020)
 Cherise Khaund (Term expires 2022)

Boundary
In addition to Concord, the district includes: Clayton, Clyde, North Gate, Pacheco, and Pleasant Hill. It also includes the majority of Bay Point, and sections of Contra Costa Centre, Martinez, Pittsburg, Reliez Valley, Shell Ridge, Vine Hill, and Walnut Creek.

Demographics
Approximately 36,000 students are enrolled at MDUSD. The racial makeup of MDUSD's students is 55.0% Non-Hispanic white, 26.7% Hispanic, 7.8% Asian, 5.2% African American, 3.7% Filipino, 1.1% Pacific Islander, and 0.5% Native American.

Schools and Programs

Elementary schools
 Ayers
 Bancroft
 Bel Air
 Cambridge
 Cornerstone
 Delta View
 El Monte
 Fair Oaks
 Gregory Gardens
 Hidden Valley
 Highlands
 Holbrook
Meadow Homes
 Monte Gardens (magnet school)
 Mt. Diablo
 Mountain View
 Pleasant Hill
 Rio Vista
 Sequoia
 Shore Acres
 Silverwood
 Strandwood
 Sun Terrace
 Sunrise
 Valhalla
 Valle Verde
 Walnut Acres
 Westwood
 Woodside
 Wren Avenue
 Ygnacio Valley

Middle schools
 Diablo View
 El Dorado
 Foothill
 Oak Grove
 Pine Hollow
 Pleasant Hill
 Riverview
 Sequoia (magnet school)
 Valley View

High schools

 College Park
 Concord
 Mt. Diablo
 Northgate
 Ygnacio Valley

Clayton Valley High School operated as an MDUSD school from 1958 to 2012. In 2012 it was converted to a charter school and is no longer part of the MDUSD.

Pacifica High School operated from 1955 until 1976 when it was closed. The campus was then re-opened as Riverview Middle School.

Pleasant Hill High School operated from 1953 until 1980 when it was closed. The campus later re-opened as Pleasant Hill Middle School.

Alternative schools
 Alliance Program - Mental Health Collaborative
 Crossroads NSHS (necessary small high school)
 Diablo Day School
 Foster Youth Services - service, not a school
 Gateway NSHS
 Home and Hospital - program, not a school
 Horizons: CIS (Center for Independent Study) - program, not a school
 Horizons: Home Study - program, not a school
 Nueva Vista NSHS
 Olympic High (continuation high school)
 Prospect NSHS
 Robert Shearer - pre-school
 Shadelands - pre-school
 Summit NSHS
 Transitional Learning Center (TLC)
 Work Experience Education

Adult education program
 Mt. Diablo Adult Education

History
The earliest schools in the area were grammar schools, each independently founded after the Civil War. The first school in Concord, for example, was a two-story building constructed in 1870 at the corner of Grant and Bonifacio streets; this was replaced by an even larger school on Willow Pass Road in 1892.

MDUSD was formed in 1948 from the Mount Diablo Union High School District and the local grammar schools.

References

External links
 MDUSD Official Website

 
School districts in Contra Costa County, California
1948 establishments in California